This article lists the political parties in the Republic of China (Taiwan) from 7 December 1949.

The organization of political parties in Taiwan is governed by the Political Parties Act, enacted on 6 December 2017. The Political Parties Act defines political parties as "political groups consisting of ROC citizens with a common political ideology who safeguard the free, democratic, constitutional order, assist in shaping the political will of the people, and nominate candidates for election to public office."

Prior to the passage of the Political Parties Act, political organizations in Taiwan followed the Civil Associations Act, also known as the Civil Organizations Act, promulgated in 1989. The Civil Associations Act required that groups held a convention to announce the formation of a political party, and within thirty days of the announcement, provide a list of party members and a party charter to the Ministry of the Interior. Groups established when the Civil Associations Act was in effect should have revised their charters to comply with the Political Parties Act by 7 December 2019. To be compliant with the Political Parties Act, political groups must additionally convene a representative assembly or party congress for four consecutive years and have followed relevant laws and regulations governing the nomination of candidates to campaign in elections for public office for the same time period. Within one year of filing for political party status, a political group must complete legal person registration. The Ministry of the Interior requires that political parties submit annual property and financial statements. Political organizations that do not meet these regulations were dissolved and removed from the registry of political parties.

Current parties

Parties with national or local representation 
 National representation includes the President, the Vice President, and the 113 national legislator seats in the Legislative Yuan.
 Local representation includes the 22 mayors/magistrates executive positions and 912 local legislator (councils) seats of the 6 special municipalities, 3 cities and 13 counties.

Full list of registered political parties 
The following is a full list of registered political parties according to the Ministry of the Interior, by order of registration. Dates indicate date of founding.

Historical parties

Taiwan under Japanese rule 

Political party movements in Taiwan started in the late 1910s after World War I, during the Taishō period (Taishō Democracy). Taiwanese political movements at this time were to modify the discriminatory colonial laws established in earlier years, and to setup local autonomy systems like in Mainland Japan. The largest political movement at this time was the Petition Movement for the Establishment of a Taiwanese Parliament. At the same time, the International Communist Movement also influenced Taiwan, many Left-wing parties and organizations were also established.

Notable Taiwanese parties during this time are:
 Taiwan Dōkakai (Taiwanese Hokkien: Tâi-oân Tông-hòa-hōe, Japanese: Taiwan Dōkakai)
 New People Society (Taiwanese Hokkien: Sin-bîn-hōe, Japanese: Shinminkai)
 Taiwanese Cultural Association (Taiwanese Hokkien: Tâi-oân Bûn-hòa Hia̍p-hōe, Japanese: Taiwan Bunka Kyōkai)
 Taiwanese Federation of Workers' Unions (Taiwanese Hokkien: Tâi-oân Kang-iú Chóng Liân-bêng, Japanese: Taiwan Kōyū Sōrenmei)
 Taiwanese Peasants Union (Taiwanese Hokkien: Tâi-oân Lông-bîn Cho͘-ha̍p, Japanese: Taiwan Nōmin Kumiai)
 Taiwanese Communist Party (Taiwanese Hokkien: Tâi-oân Kiōng-sán Tóng, Japanese: Taiwan Kyōsan-tō)
 Taiwanese People's Party (Taiwanese Hokkien: Tâi-oân Bîn-chiòng Tóng, Japanese: Taiwan Minshu-tō)
 Taiwan Local Autonomy Union (Taiwanese Hokkien: Tâi-oân Tē-hng Chū-tī Liân-bêng, Japanese: Taiwan Tihō-jiti Renmei)

At the same time, the political parties in Mainland Japan also affected Taiwan. Those who served as Governor-General of Taiwan were also members of the House of Peers of the Imperial Diet. Party affiliations of the Governor-Generals were:
 Rikken Seiyūkai (Taiwanese Hokkien: Li̍p-hiàn Chèng-iú-hōe)
 Kenseikai (Taiwanese Hokkien: Hiàn-chèng-hōe)
 Rikken Minseitō (Taiwanese Hokkien: Li̍p-hiàn Bîn-chèng Tóng)

In the late 1930s, the Empire of Japan joined the Second World War. To prepare for the Pacific War, all political parties in Mainland Japan were merged into a single organization
 
with its Taiwanese branch
 Kōmin Hōkōkai (Taiwanese Hokkien: Hông-bîn Hōng-kong-hōe, Japanese: Kōmin Hōkōkai)
was the only legal political party-like organization in Taiwan until the end of World War II.

Taiwan under the Republic of China 

Taiwan was ceded back to the Republic of China, founded in 1912 on the mainland, on 25 October 1945. From 1945 until 1949, political parties in China which had operated covertly under Japanese rule were permitted to operate in Taiwan province. The ruling Kuomintang set up formal branches in Taiwan, and so did other major political parties including the Chinese Communist Party (in 1946). Although it had no formal connection with the Taiwanese Communist Party suppressed by Japanese authorities in the 1930s (which was instead affiliated with the Communist Party of Japan), the Taiwan branch of the Chinese Communist Party absorbed many former members of the Taiwanese Communist Party. However, against the backdrop of the Chinese Civil War which erupted soon after the retrocession of Taiwan, the Kuomintang-controlled Republic of China government attempted to restrict the operation of Chinese Communist Party cells in Taiwan, and other opposition parties.

With the Republic of China government rapidly losing the Chinese Civil War against the Chinese Communist Party, the ruling Kuomintang began preparing to move the government to Taiwan in 1949. Taiwan was placed under martial law from 19 May 1949 to 15 July 1987. The Taiwan provincial branch of the Chinese Communist Party was particularly targeted, and by 1952 had been completely destroyed.

During this time, all forms of opposition were forbidden by the government, only three political parties that retreated to Taiwan were allowed to participate the elections.
 Kuomintang (Taiwanese Hokkien: Tiong-kok Kok-bîn-tóng)
 Chinese Youth Party (Taiwanese Hokkien: Tiong-kok Chheng-liân-tóng)
 China Democratic Socialist Party (Taiwanese Hokkien: Tiong-kok Bîn-chú Siā-hoē-tóng)
All other oppositions who were not allowed not form a political party could only be listed as "independent candidate". These movements were called Tangwai movement (literally outside of Kuomintang). A notable exception in this era was
 Democratic Progressive Party (Taiwanese Hokkien: Bîn-chú Chìn-pō͘ Tóng).
It was established "illegally" on 28 September 1986, then was legalized in the next year by the lifting of the martial law.

As Taiwan democratized in the late 1980s, the number of legally registered political parties in Taiwan had increased exponentially and continued to increase year by year, indicating a liberal democracy and high political freedom in Taiwan.

In recent decades, Taiwan's political campaigns can be classified to two ideological blocs
 The Pan-Green Coalition, led by Democratic Progressive Party, favors Taiwanization and the Taiwan independence movement, eventually aiming to establish a Taiwanese sovereign state.
 The Pan-Blue Coalition, led by Kuomintang, is in favor of building closer ties with mainland China and the eventual Chinese unification under the Government of the Republic of China.
The majority in both coalitions state a desire to maintain the status quo for now. Many minor parties in Taiwan are unaligned with either coalition.

On 6 December 2017, the Political Parties Act was enforced. The Act requires the political parties to maintain a number of compliance, including
 File a declaration to the Ministry of the Interior, AND register as a legal person to a District Court,
 Convene representative assembly or party congress at least once in a four-year period,
 Nominate candidates in national or local elections at least once in a four-year period, and
 Compliance on funding source, accounting, and financial transparency.
By the end of 2018, among the 343 existing political party declarations: 220 have met the new compliance, 56 chose to dissolve or transformed to a national political association.

See also 

 Conservatism in Taiwan
 Progressivism in Taiwan
 February 28 Incident
 History of Taiwan
 Economic history of Taiwan
 Politics of the Republic of China
 Political parties of the Empire of Japan
 History of political parties in China
 List of political parties by country
 List of rulers of Taiwan
 Elections in Taiwan

Notes

Words in native languages

References

External links 
 Ministry of the Interior (Taiwan)
 The website of Parties and National Political Associations — Ministry of the Interior (Taiwan)
 Political Parties Act
 Document unearthed shows double-dealing of Chiang behind 228 Incident - Taiwan News

 
Taiwan
Political parties
Politics of Taiwan
Taiwan
Political parties